Jinnah Hospital may refer to:

Pakistan
Jinnah Hospital, Lahore
Jinnah Hospital, Karachi
Jinnah Hospital, Islamabad
Jinnah Hospital, Mirpur

Afghanistan
Jinnah Hospital, Kabul